Hugo Fattoruso  was born in Montevideo, Uruguay in 1943.  Fattoruso is a composer, arranger, multi-instrumentalist and vocalist.
As well as developing a career as a soloist, he has participated and performed in many different genres: Trio Fattoruso (with his son Francisco and his brother Osvaldo), Hot Blowers, Los Shakers, Opa, Eduardo Mateo, etc.  He has collaborated also with such renowned artists as : Airto Moreira, Abraham Laboriel, Manolo Badrena, Chico Buarque, Milton Nascimento, Ruben Rada, Djavan, etc.

Career 

1952–1958: Trío Fattoruso
1959–1963: The Hot Blowers.
1964–1969: Los Shakers
1969–2005: Opa
2000–present: Trío Fattoruso
2003–present: Hugo Fattoruso and Rey Tambor
2004–present: Soloist
2007: With Yahiro Tomohiro created "Dos Orientales"

Discography 
 Los Shakers:
 "Los Shakers" 
 "Shakers for You"
 "La Conferencia Secreta del Toto´s Bar"  
 "Por Favor" 
 "Break it All" 
 "Bonus Tracks"
 Hugo & Osvaldo Fattoruso       "La Bossa Nova de Hugo y Osvaldo" 
 Airto Moreira                         Fingers (CTI, 1972)
 Eumir Deodato & Airto Moreira (live)              "In Concert"
 Opa Goldenwings 
 Opa Magic Time
 Airto                          "I'm Fine How Are You" 
 Manolo Badrena          "Manolo" 
 Opa                            "En Vivo y Rarities" (re-edition, CD of LP "Opa En Vivo")
 Opa                            "Back Home" 
 Otroshakers                    "A Los Shakers" 
 Barcarola – 1981 –             "Barcarola"
 La Escuelita                   "Ahora Sí" 
 Jaime Roos                       "Mediocampo"
 Los Pusilánimes                "Qué Suerte" (cassette only)
 Hugo Fattoruso                    "Oriental"
 Hugo Fattoruso y Jorge Graf       "Momentos" 
 Grupo del Cuareim              "Candombe" 
 Hugo Fattoruso                    "O Último Blues"
 Hugo Fattoruso                    "Ciencia Fictiona"
 Hugo Fattoruso                   "Varios Nombres" 
 Hugo Fattoruso                    Homework
 Rey Tambor                     "Palo y Mano" 
 Trío Fattoruso                 "En Vivo en Medio y Medio" 
 Trío Fattoruso                 "Trío Fattoruso"
 Candombe en New York            "Alma y Vida"
 Ricardo Nolé -H.Fattoruso      "Dos Álbumes de Música Uruguaya" ( CD's edition of you first soloist LP  "Varios Nombres")
 with Milton Nascimento:
 "Planeta Blue Na Estrada do Sol" 
 "Milton" 
 "Angelus"
 "Journey to Down"
 "Tambores de Minas" 
 "Nascimento" (H.Fattoruso, arranger)
 Chico Buarque de Holanda       "Morro Dois Irmaos" 
 Ruben Rada                     "Montevideo"
 Ruben Rada                     "Montevideo 2"
 Ruben Rada -H.Fattoruso        "Las Aventuras de Fatto-Rada"
 Djavan                         "Meu Lado"
 Takamasa Segi                  "Forest Rain"
 Takamasa Segi                  "Silencio" 
 María de Fátima                "Bahía com H"
 Rey Tambor                     "Emotivo" 
 Lee Tomboulian & Circo                     "North/South Convergence" (arranger, producer)
 H. Fattoruso y Yahiro Tomohiro "Dos Orientales"
 Hugo Fattoruso                 "Café y Bar Ciencia Fictiona"
 Mio Matsuda                    "Flor Criolla"
 Mio Matsuda                    "Compas del Sur"
 Hugo Fattoruso Y Barrio Opa

Filmography
 El chevrolé (1999)
 Sueños y pesadillas (2011)
Dos Orientales (2015)

References

External links 

"Rey Tambor"
"Hugo Fattoruso" en Candombe.com
"Trio Fattoruso"
Osvaldo Fattoruso, Duelo de Tambores.

1943 births
Living people
Latin jazz musicians
Jazz pianists
20th-century Uruguayan male singers
Uruguayan jazz musicians
Jazz composers
Milestone Records artists
Uruguayan expatriates in the United States
Male pianists
21st-century pianists
Male jazz composers
21st-century Uruguayan male singers
Opa (Uruguayan band) members
Latin Grammy Lifetime Achievement Award winners
Latin music composers